Banat, Bačka and Baranya was a province of the Kingdom of Serbia and the Kingdom of Serbs, Croats and Slovenes between November 1918 and 1922. It included the geographical regions of Banat, Bačka, and Baranya and its administrative center was Novi Sad. They were later separated from the country to become SAP Vojvodina in 1945 with the creation of Federal Yugoslavia; smaller parts of Baranya were incorporated into Croatia or ceded to Kingdom of Hungary, while a portion of Banat was ceded to Kingdom of Romania.

Name

The official name of the province was Banat, Bačka and Baranya, but it was also unofficially known as Vojvodina.

History

Following the collapse of Austria-Hungary in October 1918, the regions of Banat, Bačka and Baranya came under control of the Serbian army, in November. They entered Novi Sad on 9 November and dismantled the Hungarian-supported Banat Republic on 15 November. The local ethnic Serb population from these regions had already formed its own administration under the supreme authority of Serb National Board in Novi Sad.

On November 25, 1918, the Great National Assembly of Serbs, Bunjevci and other Slavs (Велика народна скупштина Срба, Буњеваца и осталих Словена, Velika narodna skupština Srba, Bunjevaca i ostalih Slovena) ) from Banat, Bačka and Baranya, voted that these regions join to the Kingdom of Serbia. The assembly numbered 757 deputies, of whom 578 were Serbs, 84 Bunjevci, 62 Slovaks, 21 Rusyns, 6 Germans, 3 Šokci, 2 Croats, and 1 Hungarian.

The Great People's Assembly decided to join Banat, Bačka and Baranya to Serbia, and formed a new local administration (government) in these regions known as the People's Administration for Banat, Bačka and Baranya ( / Народна управа за Банат, Бачку и Барању). The president of the People's Administration was Jovan Lalošević. The People's Council was formed as the legislative body of the province.

On December 1, the Kingdom of Serbia together with the State of Slovenes, Croats and Serbs formed a new country named Kingdom of Serbs, Croats and Slovenes.

Although the government in Belgrade accepted the decision that Banat, Bačka and Baranya had joined Serbia, it did not recognize the People's Administration. The People's Administration for Banat, Bačka and Baranya was active until March 11, 1919, when it held its last session.

Before the peace conference defined the exact borders of the Kingdom of Serbs, Croats and Slovenes, the People's Administration for Banat, Bačka and Baranya also administered parts of Banat, Bačka and Baranya that today belong to Romania and Hungary.

After the Paris peace conference, the Banat, Bačka and Baranya province remained in place until the Vidovdan Constitution of 1921 which established the Kingdom of Serbs, Croats, and Slovenes as a unitary state and replaced in 1922 the 8 Pokrajinas (provinces) by 33 new administrative oblasts (counties) ruled from the center.

Population

The population of Banat, Bačka and Baranya (within the borders defined by the peace conference) was 1,365,596, including 29.1% Serbs, 27.71% Hungarians, 23.10% Germans, and others (such as Romanians). Serbs and Croats together comprised 36.80% of population of the region.

Institutions

The legislative body (parliament) of the province was known as the Great People's Council (Veliki Narodni Savet), while executive body (government) was known as the People's Administration (Narodna Uprava). The Great People's Council consisted of 50 members, which included 35 Serbs, 8 Bunjevci, 5 Slovaks, 1 Krashovan, and 1 Uniate priest.

The People's Administration included following sections:
Political affairs
Internal affairs
Jurisdiction
Education
Finances
Traffic
Economy
Food and supplies
Social reforms
People's Health
People's Defence

Administrators
Jovan Lalošević, president of the People's Administration, people's commissioner for political affairs, and temporary people's commissioner for education
Petar Konjović, vice-president of the People's Administration
Jovan Hranilović, temporary president of the Great People's Council
Slavko Miletić, president of the Great People's Council
Jovan Latinčić, vice-president of the Great People's Council
Ignjat Pavlas, people's commissioner for internal affairs
August Rat, people's commissioner for jurisdiction
Vladislav Manojlović, people's commissioner for finances
Stevan Slavnić, people's commissioner for traffic
Mita Klicin, people's commissioner for economy
Kosta Popović, people's commissioner for food and supplies
Dušan Tušanović, people's commissioner for social reforms
Laza Marković, people's commissioner for people's health
Dušan Popov, people's commissioner for people's defense

See also

History of Vojvodina
History of Serbia

References

Sources
 Drago Njegovan, Prisajedinjenje Vojvodine Srbiji, Novi Sad, 2004.
 Lazo M. Kostić, Srpska Vojvodina i njene manjine, Novi Sad, 1999.
 Dimitrije Boarov, Politička istorija Vojvodine, Novi Sad, 2001.
 Čedomir Popov, Jelena Popov, Autonomija Vojvodine – srpsko pitanje, Sremski Karlovci, 2000.

External links

 Vojvodina u Prvom svetskom ratu
Nedovršeno prisajedinjenje Vojvodine Srbiji
Srbi u Rumuniji od ranog srednjeg veka do današnjeg vremena
Map
Map
Map

Pokrajinas of the Kingdom of Serbs, Croats and Slovenes
Former subdivisions of Serbia
Aftermath of World War I in Hungary
Yugoslav Serbia
History of Banat
History of Bačka
History of Baranya (region)
1910s in Romania
1918 establishments in Yugoslavia
1919 disestablishments in Yugoslavia
Yugoslav unification